Gacé is a commune in the Orne department in Lower-Normandy, north-western France.

Population

Heraldry

Administration

Twin towns
  Kinross, Perth & Kinross, Scotland

See also
 Communes of the Orne department
 Château de Gacé

References

Communes of Orne